Richard Houghton or Hoghton may refer to:

Politicians
Richard Houghton (died 1559) (1496/98–1559), MP for Lancashire
Richard Houghton (died c. 1422) (c. 1322–c. 1422), MP for Lancashire
Richard Houghton (MP for Wallingford) (fl. 1469), MP for Wallingford
Sir Richard Hoghton, 1st Baronet (1570–1630), MP for Lancashire
Sir Richard Hoghton, 3rd Baronet (c. 1616–1678), MP for Lancashire

Others
Richard Houghton (lieutenant), commander during Royalton raid
Richard Houghton (rally driver) in 2009 Australian Rally Championship etc.

See also
Richard A. Houghten, organic chemist
Richard Haughton (disambiguation)